Oteman Sampson (born April 25, 1975) is a former American football quarterback who played three seasons in the Canadian Football League with the Calgary Stampeders, Toronto Argonauts and Ottawa Renegades. He first enrolled at Albany State University before transferring to Florida A&M University. He attended Miami Edison High School in Little Haiti, Miami, Florida. He was also a member of the San Francisco Demons of the XFL.

References

External links
Just Sports Stats
Fanbase profile

Living people
1975 births
Players of American football from Miami
American football quarterbacks
Canadian football quarterbacks
Albany State Golden Rams football players
Florida A&M Rattlers football players
Calgary Stampeders players
Toronto Argonauts players
San Francisco Demons players
Ottawa Renegades players
Miami Edison Senior High School alumni
Players of Canadian football from Miami